Musculoskeletal physiology is the branch of physiology which addresses the processes of musculoskeletal system.

In subclassifying musculoskeletal physiology, MeSH emphasizes the division between "phenomena" and "processes". It is also possible to emphasize the division between processes primarily affecting bone, and those primarily affecting muscle.

See also
 Exercise physiology
 Human physiology

References

Musculoskeletal system